The Vlora War or the War of 1920 ( or Lufta e Njëzetës) was a series of battles between Italian forces garrisoned throughout the Vlorë region of Albania (an Italian protectorate) and Albanian nationalists, who were divided into small groups of fighters. The war lasted three months until an armistice; it had great impact in the struggle of Albania for the safeguard of its territories while Albanian borders and future were discussed in the Paris Peace Conference. The Vlora War is seen as a turning point in the establishment of Albanian independence.

Background
Before entering the First World War as an ally of Triple Entente the Kingdom of Italy had signed the secret Treaty of London: Italy promised to declare war against Germany and Austria-Hungary within a month in exchange of some territorial gains at the end of the war. The promised territories of Albania to Italy were treated in Articles 6 and 7 of the treaty:
Article 6
Italy shall receive full sovereignty over Valona, the island of Saseno and surrounding territory....

Article 7
Having obtained the Trentino and Istria by Article 4, Dalmatia and the Adriatic islands by Article 5, and also the gulf of Valona, Italy undertakes, in the event a small, autonomous, and neutralized state being formed in Albania Italy not to oppose the possible desire of France, Great Britain, and Russia to repartition the northern and the southern districts of Albania between Montenegro, Serbia, and Greece. The southern coast of Albania, from the frontier of the Italian territory of Valona to Cape Stilos, is to be neutralized. The Italy will be conceded the right of concluding the foreign relations of Albania; in any case, Italy will be bound to secure for Albania a territory sufficiently extensive to enable its frontiers to join those of Greece and Serbia to the west of Lake Ochrida ..

In 1920 in allies in the Paris Peace Conference had still reached no decision on Albania's future, but Italy's claims to sovereignty over Vlorë had never been seriously challenged. Italian Prime Minister Francesco Saverio Nitti had also hoped to obtain a mandate over the rest of the country according to the secret Treaty of London.

Orders of battle

Albanian order of battle

Italian order of battle

Course of war

The war started on June 4, after Italian General Settimo Piacentini refused to hand over the Vlora district to the Albanian government. Albania had previously forced much of the Italian occupation to leave the country, but after demands by Ahmet Zogu, the then interior-minister of Albania, to continue the evacuation were rejected by Italy, the Albanians announced the establishment of the National Defense Committee under the leadership of Qazim Koculi and began to gather volunteers. Ahmet Lepenica became the commander in chief of the detachment consisting of around 4000 men. The Albanian insurgents were poorly armed and not everyone even carried a gun; some were armed with nothing but sticks and stones. In and around Vlora were around 25,000 Italian soldiers who were stationed in the area with artillery.

The Albanians engaged in fighting in the Vlora region and soon the rebels were bolstered by volunteers in the region. This increased the size of the force to upwards of 10,000 irregulars, which also included the Banda e Vatrës, an Albanian military band that was formed in the United States that travelled 23 days by boat from the US to Durrës. However during the course of warfare not more than 4,000 Albanians engaged. The advance of the Albanian troops as well as communist revolutionary movements and riots within the army in Italy made reinforcements to the Italian soldiers in Vlora impossible. Morale crumbled among the Italian soldiers barricaded inside Vlora, without orders and with malaria and communist agitation spreading among the ranks.

On August 2, 1920, the Albanian-Italian protocol was signed under which Italy would retreat from Albania. That ended Italian claims for Vlora and a mandate over Albania, rescuing the territory of the Albanian state from further partition. A ceasefire was announced on August 5, ending all Italo-Albanian hostilities.

Armistice

After three months of warfare, an armistice agreement was signed between the Italian and the Albanian governments. It had these main points:
 The Italian Government completely acknowledged the independence, territorial integrity, and sovereignty of Albania, within the frontiers defined in 1913 by the Conference of Ambassadors in London.
 The Italian government relinquished its protectorate proclaimed in 1917 and the occupation and administration of Vlorë and its hinterland, and renounced all claims against Albania and all interference in Albanian political affairs, and abandoned the idea of a mandate over the country.
 The Italian government agreed to withdraw its war materials from Vlorë and its hinterland, to evacuate all its holdings on the Albanian mainland, and to repatriate at an early date the Italian troops actually stationed in Vlorë and on the littoral, and all its forces still remaining in other parts of Albanian territory with the exception of the garrison on the island of Sazan at the entrance of the Vlorë bay; Italy retained the permanent possession only of the island of Sazan, but remained in temporary occupation of Cape Linguetta and cape Treporti, both dominating Vlorë bay, with the right to fortify them; the detachment of troops at Shkodër was also to remain in that town.
 There would take place an exchange of prisoners, the liberation of arrested persons under a general mutual amnesty, and the settlement of outstanding questions concerning the private interests of Albanian and Italian subjects.

It was the first diplomatic pact between Albania and a foreign power. Albania had used all its influence to obtain full and unreserved recognition by the Western powers of the independence of Albania within 1913 borders. Benito Mussolini described Italian failure at Vlora as "Albanian Caporetto".

References

Further reading 
 Akademia e Shkencave e RPSSH "Fjalori Enciklopedik Shqiptar", Tirana, 1985.
 Pearson, Owen. Albania in the Twentieth Century: A History. Volume One. New York: I.B. Tauris, 2006.
 Sette, Alessandro. From Paris to Vlorë. Italy and the Settlement of the Albanian Question (1919-1920), in The Paris Peace Conference (1919-1920) and Its Aftermath: Settlements, Problems and Perceptions, eds. S. Arhire, T. Rosu, Cambridge Scholars Publishing, Newcastle upon Tyne, 2020.

Military history of Italy
Military history of Albania
Conflicts in 1920
1920 in Albania
Wars involving Albania
Wars involving Italy
Battle Of
Vlora
1920 in Italy